Ron Pundak (14 May 1955 – 11 April 2014) was an Israeli historian and journalist. He played an important role in starting the Oslo peace process in 1993, and was part of the core group behind the Geneva Initiative. Pundak was the executive director of the Peres Center for Peace in Tel Aviv-Yafo and co-chairman of its Palestinian-Israeli Peace NGO Forum. He was on the board of directors of the Aix Group.

Background
Ron Pundak was born in Tel Aviv. His parents are Danish Jewish immigrants from Denmark. He was the son of Herbert Pundik, a Danish-Israeli journalist and author. In 1991 Pundak graduated from the University of London with a PhD in Middle Eastern Political History.

Career
After his return to Israel, he worked as a journalist at the Israeli daily newspaper Ha'aretz for one year. Together with fellow academic Yair Hirschfeld, he founded an NGO called the Economic Cooperation Foundation (ECF), through which they established relationships with Palestinian leaders, which eventually led to the Oslo peace process. In 2001 Pundak became director general of the Peres Center for Peace in Tel Aviv-Yafo, a position he held until 2011.

Personal life
Pundak died age 58 on 11 April 2014 after a long period with cancer.

References

External links
Bio at the Peres-Center
Aix Group

1955 births
2014 deaths
Alumni of the University of London
Israeli Jews
Israeli journalists
People from Tel Aviv
Israeli people of Danish-Jewish descent